The Enggano scops owl (Otus enganensis) is an owl endemic to Enggano Island, Indonesia.

References

BirdLife Species Factsheet - Enggano Scops-owl
Red Data Book

Enggano scops owl
Birds of Enggano
Enggano scops owl
Enggano scops owl